Glochidion hylandii  known as the buttonwood, Hyland's buttonwood or pin flower tree is a plant in the family Phyllanthaceae. It is found in tropical north eastern Australia in the vicinity of the Atherton Tableland. Usually a small tree found in disturbed rainforest areas. The fruit capsule resembles a miniature Queensland Blue pumpkin (Cucurbita pepo). The buttonwood is named in honour of the botanist Bernard Hyland.

References

Flora of Queensland
hylandii